Las Animas is the Statutory City that is the county seat, the most populous community, and the only incorporated municipality in Bent County, Colorado, United States. The city population was 2,410 at the 2010 United States Census. Las Animas is located on the Arkansas River, just west of its confluence with the Purgatoire River (or "Purgatory River"), in southeast Colorado east of Pueblo, near the historic Bent's Fort.

Etymology
According to legend, the town and the Purgatoire River were named after a group of conquistadors, probably part of Coronado's expedition, who died without the last rites sacrament of a priest. According to Catholic belief, their souls would go to Purgatory as a result. The original Spanish name for Las Ánimas ("The Souls," in Spanish) was purported to be La Ciudad de Las Ánimas Perdidas en Purgatorio, "The city of lost souls in Purgatory."

However, according to author Morris F. Taylor, this is not consistent with Spanish Catholic belief, but a French Catholic belief. The Spanish version, El Río de las Ánimas Perdidas en Purgatorio, was considered an embellishment of the French version. No 19th-century map shows this full Spanish name or any translation of it. Existing maps have different names for the river: Río de Las Ánimas, Purgatory River, and "Picatoire", a corruption of Purgatoire (which today is anglicized as Picketwire). French fur traders of the 19th century referred to the river as the Purgatoire. Another anglicization was the Pick of Ware.

History

Early settlement
Gantt's Picket Post, also known as Fort Gantt, was built near the present-day Las Animas in 1832, operating as a trading post until 1834. The second Fort Lyon military post was built in Las Animas in 1867. It operated until 1897.

Water issues
Water is a central issue in Las Animas. Like many cities in southeastern Colorado, Las Animas competes with wealthier cities on the Front Range for the water to sustain life and the local agricultural economy. Developers and municipalities have capitalized upon drought and low crop prices by buying water from desperate farmers. As this water is diverted upstream to serve the larger cities, Las Animas loses access to this important resource.

Because of the poor quality of the city's water supply, a reverse-osmosis filtration plant was installed in the mid-1990s. The loss of minerals in the water resulted in the collapse of many water mains, which had been supported by mineral deposits that formed on the insides of the pipes.

Geography

Las Animas is located in northwest Bent County at  (38.066980, -103.225937), along the Arkansas River. U.S. Highway 50 is the main highway through the city, leading west  to Pueblo and east  to Lamar.

Climate
Las Animas is often one of the warmest cities in Colorado, however winters can still be quite cold. The record low temperature in Las Animas of  occurred most recently on January 28, 1948. Each year there are roughly 83 afternoons that hit  or hotter, with 22 reaching at least .

Demographics

As of the census of 2000, there were 2,758 people, 1,091 households, and 716 families residing in the city. The racial makeup of the city was 74.87% White, 0.91% African American, 2.86% Native American, 0.58% Asian, 15.34% from other races, and 5.44% from two or more races. Hispanic or Latino of any race were 42.60% of the population.

There were 1,091 households, out of which 31.0% had children under the age of 18 living with them, 46.0% were married couples living together, 14.8% had a female householder with no husband present, and 34.3% were non-families. 30.7% of all households were made up of individuals, and 14.6% had someone living alone who was 65 years of age or older.  The average household size was 2.46 and the average family size was 3.04.

In the city, the population was spread out, with 27.3% under the age of 18, 8.6% from 18 to 24, 24.0% from 25 to 44, 22.2% from 45 to 64, and 17.9% who were 65 years of age or older.  The median age was 38 years. For every 100 females, there were 94.1 males.  For every 100 females age 18 and over, there were 117.8 males.

The median income for a household in the city was $26,157, and the median income for a family was $29,815. Males had a median income of $26,168 versus $23,250 for females. The per capita income for the city was $13,893.  About 19.7% of families and 25.0% of the population were below the poverty line, including 39.3% of those under age 18 and 14.4% of those age 65 or over.

Santa Fe Trail Day
Las Animas sits along the Mountain Branch of the Santa Fe Trail and served as the major city in southeast Colorado until the Atchison, Topeka and Santa Fe Railroad established operations in La Junta,  to the west of Las Animas.

Las Animas celebrates an annual Santa Fe Trail Day, a celebration of the pioneers and traders who used this trail. This local holiday is the oldest student council-sponsored event in the US. The Las Animas High School Student Council organizes the day, with assistance from the Bent County Chamber of Commerce. Festivities have included a parade, a costume contest, square dancing, a demolition derby, and a traditional "Ranchburger" lunch, as well as many other activities. In past years, students have spread out events over a two-day period, sometimes making this a weekend event. The event occurs on the last Friday in April.

On April 24, 2009, Las Animas celebrated its 75th Annual Santa Fe Trail Day with events throughout the weekend. Past Santa Fe Trail Day Queen Royalty, dating to the 1940s, were invited, as well as Student Council Presidents since 1944.

Education

Columbian Elementary School
Built in 1916 to replace the old Columbian School (1887), Columbian Elementary School was the only building of Spanish architecture style in Las Animas. It was also the only open-courtyard school in the state of Colorado. In 2004, it was added to the National Register of Historic Places because of its significance, and, needing renovation for continued use, it was on the 2004 Colorado Preservation, Inc. List of Endangered Places. This building is no longer there, it was deemed unsafe tore down and a new school building was built.

Considered by the School Board and all but a handful of citizens to be too costly to renovate, this 90-year-old building was demolished on February 21, 2006. Following demolition, the school was delisted on July 26, 2006. The city constructed a new elementary school just west of the old school location.

Transportation
Las Animas is incorporated into the  Bustang's network. It is part of Lamar-Pueblo-Colorado Springs Outrider line.

Notable people

Notable individuals who were born in or have lived in Las Animas include fur trader and rancher William Bent, actor and singer Ken Curtis, and editor and arts patron Mari Yoriko Sabusawa.

See also

Outline of Colorado
Index of Colorado-related articles
State of Colorado
Colorado cities and towns
Colorado municipalities
Colorado counties
Bent County, Colorado
Bent's Old Fort National Historic Site
Santa Fe National Historic Trail

References

External links

CDOT map of the City of Las Animas

Cities in Bent County, Colorado
Cities in Colorado
County seats in Colorado
Colorado populated places on the Arkansas River